Chambers Lodge (also, McKinney) is an unincorporated community in Placer County, California. It lies at an elevation of 6237 feet (1901 m).

The McKinney post office opened in 1884, changed the name to Chambers Lodge in 1928, and closed for good in 1959. The name McKinney honored John McKinney who settled there in 1864. The name Chambers Lodge honored David H. Chambers who built a lodge at the site in 1928.

References

Unincorporated communities in California
Unincorporated communities in Placer County, California